Viktor Vladimirovich Gulevich (born 14 May 1969) is a Belarusian general who is the current Chief of the General Staff of the Armed Forces of Belarus.

Biography 
He was born in 1969 in the village of Bolshaya Pader in the Slutsk District, of the Byelorussian SSR. After graduating from high school, he entered the Moscow Higher Military Command School, which he graduated from with honors in 1990. He began his service as a platoon commander in the Group of Soviet Forces in Germany. Then he served in the Transcaucasian Military District. After the collapse of the USSR, he returned to a newly independent Belarus, where he again commanded a platoon and rose to the rank of regimental commander in the 103rd Guards Airborne Division. In 2002, he graduated with a gold medal from the Command and Staff Faculty of the Military Academy of Belarus. He then served in various command positions. On 14 February 2011, Colonel Gulevich led the Combat Training Department of the 38th Guards Air Assault Brigade.

In 2017 he graduated from the Faculty of the General Staff of the Armed Forces of the Republic of Belarus, and in 2018 he defended his Ph.D. thesis.

In February 2020, he was appointed commander of the Western Operational Command. That June, he was promoted to major general. On 11 March 2021, he was appointed Chief of the General Staff, succeeding Alexander Volfovich.

In March 2022, Ukrainian sources reported his resignation, and posted what is claimed to be his resignation letter. The Belorusian Defence Ministry stated that it was not possible for Gulevich to resign, because the right to dismiss him was held by the Commander-in-chief. The Ministry stated that Belarusian soldiers were fully performing their duties, on Belarusian territory.

Awards 
 Honored Specialist Armed Forces of Belarus (March 5, 2019)
 Order "For Service to the Motherland" III degree (June 24, 2012)
 Medal "For Flawless Service" I (August 16, 2018), II, and III degrees

Personal life 
He is married, with his wife Victoria Lvovna Gulevich serving as a medical instructor and a signalman in the 38th Guards Air Assault Brigade. Together they have two children: Sergei and Anya.

References

External link 

1969 births
Belarusian generals
Government of Belarus
Living people
Soviet military personnel
Military Academy of the General Staff of the Armed Forces of Russia alumni
Military personnel from Minsk